Armando Chavarría Barrera (27 August 1956 – 20 August 2009) was a Mexican politician affiliated with the Party of the Democratic Revolution. He served as Senator of the LVIII and LIX Legislatures of the Mexican Congress representing Guerrero and as Deputy of the LVII Legislature.

On 20 August 2009 Chavarría was murdered when he was leaving his house.

See also
List of politicians killed in the Mexican Drug War

References

1956 births
2009 deaths
Politicians from Guerrero
Members of the Senate of the Republic (Mexico)
Members of the Chamber of Deputies (Mexico)
Party of the Democratic Revolution politicians
20th-century Mexican politicians
21st-century Mexican politicians
Assassinated Mexican politicians
Politicians killed in the Mexican Drug War
Male murder victims